Gymnocarpium dryopteris, the western oakfern, common oak fern , oak fern, or northern oak fern, is a deciduous fern of the family Cystopteridaceae. It is widespread across much of North America and Eurasia. It has been found in Canada, the United States, Greenland, China, Japan, Korea, Russia, and most of Europe.

Description
Gymnocarpium dryopteris has small, delicate fronds up to 40 cm (16 inches) long, with ternately-compound pinnae (leaves). Fronds occur singly. On the underside of matured pinnae the naked sori can be found (the Latin generic name gymnocarpium means "with naked fruit"). The species grows in coniferous woodlands and on shale talus slopes.

Gymnocarpium dryopteris, a forest understory plant, is not found in association with Quercus (oak).

In cultivation in the UK this plant and the cultivar "Plumosum" have gained the Royal Horticultural Society’s Award of Garden Merit.

References

External links

dryopteris
Ferns of the Americas
Ferns of Asia
Ferns of Europe
Plants described in 1753
Taxa named by Carl Linnaeus